The Club Naval de Ferrol is a yacht club in Galicia (Spain). This club is located in the harbor city of Ferrol.

History
The Club Naval de Ferrol was originally established on May 17, 1950, under the name Comisión Naval de Regatas (CNR). Its name was changed Club Naval de Oficiales (CNO) in February 1974 to and its scope of activities was limited to the amusement and entertainment of the Spanish Navy personnel posted to the Naval Station of Ferrol and their families.

Since May 25, 2003, the official name is Centro Deportivo y Sociocultural de Oficiales de Ferrol.

Facilities
This institution counts with an excellent library (with some antique and rare books) swimming pools, golf courses, football, basketball and tennis courts, restaurants, dancing halls, sailing clubs, and a naval museum.

External links
 Official website

Ferrol
Ferrol
Ferrol
Ferrol
Ferrol
Museums in Galicia (Spain)
Naval museums
1950 establishments in Spain